Naseri (also Romanized as Nāşerī) is a village in Cheghapur Rural District, Kaki District, Dashti County, Bushehr Province, Iran. At the 2006 census, its population was 220, in 37 families.

References 

Populated places in Dashti County